Statistics of Ekstraklasa for the 1994–95 season.

Overview
18 teams competed in the 1994–95 season with Legia Warsaw winning the championship.

League table

Results

Top goalscorers

References

External links
 Poland – List of final tables at RSSSF 

Ekstraklasa seasons
1994–95 in Polish football
Pol